Joseph Bonaparte Gulf is a large body of water off the coast of the Northern Territory and Western Australia and part of the Timor Sea. It was named after Joseph Bonaparte, brother of Napoleon and King of Naples (1806-1808) and then Spain (1808-1813) by French explorer and naturalist Nicolas Baudin in 1803.  It is also often referred to in Australia as the "Bonaparte Gulf".

Description
The Keep River and Victoria River drain into the gulf in the Northern Territory, the former close to the Western Australia - Northern Territory border.

The Ord River, Pentecost River, Durack River, King River and the Forrest River drain into the Cambridge Gulf, another gulf within the southern part of the Joseph Bonaparte Gulf.

The Legune (Joseph Bonaparte Bay) Important Bird Area lies at the south-eastern end of the gulf.  The Bonaparte Basin is a large sedimentary basin underlying the gulf and a large part of the Timor Sea, deriving its name from the Joseph Bonaparte Gulf, which has several producing and potential oilfields.

The traditional owners of the areas around the gulf are the Menhdheyangal people.

References 

 Web page of www.tutiempo.net about the Joseph Bonaparte Gulf (in Spanish).

Coastline of the Northern Territory
Cambridge Gulf
Kimberley coastline of Western Australia
IMCRA meso-scale bioregions